Katherine Ryan: Glitter Room is a stand-up comedy special by Canadian comic Katherine Ryan, her second for Netflix following Katherine Ryan: In Trouble. Glitter Room was filmed in Los Angeles, and Ryan keeps the material largely light-hearted, even though it contains uncomfortable subjects too. It was released on July 1, 2019.

References

External links
 
 
 

2019 films
2019 in Los Angeles
Netflix specials
Stand-up comedy concert films
Ryan, Katherine: Glitter Room
2010s English-language films